Apodocreedia vanderhorsti, the longfin burrower, is a species of sandburrower native to the Indian Ocean coast of southern Africa where it can be found from Delagoa Bay, Mozambique to Durban, South Africa. This species grows to a length of  TL. This species is the only known member of its genus.

References

External links
 Illustration

Creediidae
Monotypic marine fish genera
Marine fish of South Africa
Taxa named by Lieven Ferdinand de Beaufort